Dave's Picks Volume 13 is a three-CD live album by the rock band the Grateful Dead.  It contains the complete concert recorded on February 24, 1974, at the Winterland Arena in San Francisco, California. It was produced as a limited edition of 16,500 numbered copies, and was released by Rhino Records on February 1, 2015.

Critical reception
On AllMusic, Fred Thomas wrote, "This date finds the band in fantastic form, using a sound system that predated their famous "wall of sound" amplifier system by just a month, and spinning their cosmic wheels through a spirited first set of rockers... before relaxing into more wide-reaching territory in the second and third sets on extensive jams.... The sound is exceptional... and the vibe is more energetic and bright than usual, resulting in one of the more lively Dave's Picks to focus on the early–'70s era Dead."

Track listing
Disc 1
First set:
"U.S. Blues" (Jerry Garcia, Robert Hunter) – 6:22
"Mexicali Blues" (Bob Weir, John Barlow) – 3:45
"Brown-Eyed Women" (Garcia, Hunter) – 5:26
"Beat It On Down the Line" (Jesse Fuller) – 4:04
"Candyman" (Garcia, Hunter) – 7:19
"Jack Straw" (Weir, Hunter) – 5:07
"China Cat Sunflower"> (Garcia, Hunter)– 9:54
"I Know You Rider" (traditional, arranged by Grateful Dead) – 6:07
"El Paso" (Marty Robbins) – 4:52
"Loser" (Garcia, Hunter) – 6:44
"Playing in the Band" (Weir, Mickey Hart, Hunter) – 18:27

Disc 2 
Second set:
"Cumberland Blues" (Garcia, Hunter)  – 6:57
"It Must Have Been the Roses" (Hunter) – 5:38
"Big River" (Johnny Cash) – 5:25
"Bertha" (Garcia, Hunter) – 6:40
"Weather Report Suite"> – 15:34
"Prelude" (Weir)
"Part I" (Weir, Eric Andersen)
"Part II (Let It Grow)"  (Weir, Barlow)
"Row Jimmy" (Garcia, Hunter) – 10:03
"Ship of Fools" (Garcia, Hunter) – 6:08
"Promised Land" (Chuck Berry) – 3:33 

Disc 3
"Dark Star"> (Garcia, Hart, Bill Kreutzmann, Phil Lesh, Ron McKernan, Weir, Hunter) – 29:08
"Morning Dew" (Bonnie Dobson, Tim Rose) – 13:54
"Sugar Magnolia"> (Weir, Hunter) – 8:54
"Not Fade Away" (Norman Petty, Charles Hardin) – 4:49
"Goin' Down the Road Feeling Bad"> (traditional, arranged by Grateful Dead) – 7:23
"Not Fade Away" (Petty, Hardin) – 4:29
Encore:
"It's All Over Now, Baby Blue" (Bob Dylan) – 6:32

Note: The transition from "China Cat Sunflower" to "I Know You Rider" on disc 1 contains a version of the "Feelin' Groovy Jam".

Personnel
Grateful Dead
Jerry Garcia – guitar, vocals
Donna Jean Godchaux – vocals
Keith Godchaux – keyboards
Bill Kreutzmann – drums
Phil Lesh – bass, vocals
Bob Weir – guitar, vocals
Production
Produced by Grateful Dead
Produced for release by David Lemieux
CD mastering: Jeffrey Norman
Recording: Kidd Candelario
Executive producer: Mark Pinkus
Associate producers: Doran Tyson, Ivette Ramos
Art direction, design: Steve Vance
Illustrations: Micah Nelson
Photos: Steve Caraway, Richie Pechner
Tape research: Michael Wesley Johnson
Archival research: Nicholas Meriwether
Concert notes: Dick Latvala

References

13
2015 live albums
Rhino Entertainment live albums